Ongamo, or Ngas, is a probably extinct Eastern Nilotic language of Tanzania. It is closely related to the Maa languages, but more distantly than they are to each other. Ongamo has 60% of lexical similarity with Maasai, Samburu, and Camus. Speakers have shifted to Chagga, a dominant regional Bantu language.

History 
An expansion of Ngasa speakers onto the plains north of Mount Kilimanjaro occurred in the 12th century. The language was mutually intelligible with Proto-Maasai during that period. Vocabulary retention from this time attests to the cultivation of sorghum and elusine by the Ngas. Subsequent immigration of Bantu-speaking Chagga over the next five centuries considerably reduced the extent and viability of the Ngasa language.

References

Further reading
 Sommer, Gabriele (1992) 'A Survey on Language Death in Africa', in Brenzinger, Matthias (ed.) Language Death: Factual and Theoretical Explorations with Special Reference to East Africa. Berlin/New York: Mouton de Gruyter, pp. 301–417.

External links
Ngasa profile on the Endangered Languages Project

Agglutinative languages
Languages of Tanzania
Eastern Nilotic languages
Endangered languages of Africa